This article displays the rosters for the participating teams at the 2006 FIBA Africa Club Championship.

Abidjan Basket Club

APR

ASB Kauka

ASPAC

Ferroviário da Beira

Interclube

Magic Basketball Club

Niger Potters

B.C. Onatra

Petro Atlético

Primeiro de Agosto

Stade Malien

References

External links
 2006 FIBA Africa Champions Cup Participating Teams

FIBA Africa Clubs Champions Cup squads
Basketball teams in Africa
FIBA